is a Japanese shōjo manga series by Kazuko Fujita. The series first appeared in July 1990 on the 15th issue of the semimonthly Shōjo Comic.  It won the 37th Shogakukan Manga Award for shōjo. While shōjo, the series has elements of classical sports manga like player rivalry and special attacks.

The series is about high-school student Fujisaki Makoto, a figure skater who returns from Canada to Japan. As the result of a random encounter with her new school's volleyball team, she joins the team, and with her help they are able to hold off (but still loses at the end) to high school championships favorites led by Hitomi Kanou. There begins Fujisaki's road to stardom and Barcelona.

Main characters
  
 The protagonist. As a former figure skater, she is a gifted athlete and quickly learns volleyball skills even with no prior experience. She stands 172 cm tall.
  
 A childhood friend of Makoto, he is an amateur photographer.
  
 The new coach of the school volleyball team and a former Japan National Team player. He stands about 190 cm tall.
 
 The star of the Tōyō High School's volleyball team and Makoto's rival.

Manga

Makoto Call! was written and illustrated by Kazuko Fujita. It was serialized in the shōjo manga magazine Shōjo Comic from 1990 to 1992, and collected in nine tankōbon volumes by Shogakukan under the Flower Comics imprint. It was reprinted in 2003 in four bunkoban volumes.

References

External links
 Shogakukan website 

Winners of the Shogakukan Manga Award for shōjo manga
Shōjo manga
Volleyball in anime and manga
Shogakukan manga